Jaka Bizilj (born 8 December 1971 in Ljubljana) grew up in Slovenia, Libya, Tanzania, Malaysia and Germany. Bizilj studied politics, literature and film at the German University of Mainz. After his education, Bizilj became a journalist and political activist. Since 2008, Bizilj is chairman of the Cinema for Peace Foundation.

Promoter and Producer

Jaka Bizilj is a writer, promoter, and producer. He began organizing concerts in 1995 with artists such as Andrea Bocelli,  Bryan Adams, Montserrat Caballe, and Liza Minnelli and toured with artists such as José Carreras. Since the end of the 1990s, Jaka Bizilj has been working internationally as a producer and was the largest presenter of open-air opera in Europe for many years. Jaka Bizilj annually staged up to 700 concerts and live productions. Among his productions are "Magic of the Dance", Andrew Lloyd Webber's "Jesus Christ Superstar" and "Evita", Elton John’s musical Aida and the Broadway musical Jekyll & Hyde. He has also launched several festivals. In 2002, he founded the Cinema for Peace initiative and in 2008 the Cinema for Peace Foundation to create awareness of the social relevance of films and the influence of movies on the perception and resolution of global social, political, and humanitarian challenges of our time. Jaka Bizilj is also involved in the production of films, including the Richard Curtis remake “” and the documentary “Letter to Anna” about Russian journalist Anna Politkovskaya. He was also involved in the realization of the documentary "This Prison Where I Live" about the detained Myanmar comedian "Zarganar" and the recent film productions "After the Silence" and "Song of Names" with Dustin Hoffman and Anthony Hopkins.

Charity

Bizilj distributed the Bosnian Oscar-winning war-satire "No Man's Land" by Danis Tanovic. Ahead of the G8 Summit in Germany, he produced at the initiative of Bob Geldof and Richard Curtis a remake of the Golden Globe-winning film "The Girl in the Café" with Iris Berben, Julia Jentsch, Jan Josef Liefers, and Catherine Deneuve in 2007.

Together with the Trust Fund for Victims at the International Criminal Court, he organized with the Cinema for Peace Foundation - "The Special Evening on Justice" on the eve of the International Criminal Court Review Conference of the Rome Statute in Kampala, Uganda. The Cinema for Peace Foundation presented on this occasion the first "Justitia Award" to honor the United Nations and UN Secretary-General Ban Ki-moon for establishing and supporting the International Criminal Court. The award was presented to Ban Ki-moon by the Council of Europe Goodwill Ambassador Bianca Jagger.

On 8 June 2010, Bizilj hosted the "Sports for Peace" gala on the occasion of the FIFA World Cup in South Africa - the world's biggest single sporting event and the first ever FIFA World Cup to take place in Africa - bringing together the Secretary-General of the United Nations, Ban Ki-moon, South African President Jacob Zuma, Madama Graça Machel, the Nelson Mandela Foundation, 1Goal Ambassadors and many other dignitaries from across the globe to address this serious issue - the second Millennium Development Goal (MDG): "achieve universal primary education by 2015".

In 2011, he organized for the first time a Cinema for Peace Dinner in Cannes  and accompanied the visit of the 14th Dalai Lama to Wiesbaden with a film program and a charity dinner to support the culture of Tibet. Furthermore, he assisted on 24 and 25 August in The Hague a symposium on the issue of child soldiers which was held at the International Criminal Court in The Hague on the occasion of the closing statements of the case against Thomas Lubanga by arranging for film screenings and a charity dinner. Together with former child soldiers, UNHCR Goodwill Ambassador Angelina Jolie and the UN Special Representative for Children in Armed Conflict, Radhika Coomaraswamy all parties involved signed a petition urging all UN member states to condemn the use of child soldiers, to fight the use of sexual violence in war and to make efforts to prevent that schools and hospitals become targets of armed attacks.  On 23 September 2011 Jaka Bizilj produced the presentation of the first universal human rights logo on the occasion of the UN General Assembly in New York.

Bizilj also produced the Los Angeles premiere of Cinema for Peace in January 2012 by staging “Help Haiti Home” benefiting Sean Penn's J/P Haitian Relief Organization.;  Cinema for Peace Los Angeles raised US$5 million for Haiti with the help of Julia Roberts, Leonardo DiCaprio, George Clooney, Oprah Winfrey, Bill and Hillary Clinton amongst others. The Cinema for Peace-Gala in Berlin in 2012 saw Angelina Jolie receiving the “Honorary Award for Opposing War and Genocide” for her directorial debut “In the Land of Blood and Honey”. In this context Bizilj arranged for a press workshop with Angelina Jolie and Luis Moreno-Ocampo, initiating a global campaign against sexual violence in war and post-conflict zones.
In June 2012 Bizilj welcomed 100 personalities from the world of arts, film, and society on the occasion of Art Basel and “Art & Cinema for Peace” in honor of Chinese artist Ai Weiwei. This occasion included the premiere of the documentary film “Ai Weiwei – Never Sorry” by Alison Klayman. Two time Academy Award-winning actress Susan Sarandon concluded the evening with a video statement expressing the worldwide support for Ai Weiwei. At the Cinema for Peace Gala for Humanity in Los Angeles, produced by Jaka Bizilj in January 2013, Ben Affleck received the Cinema for Peace Humanitarian Award for his work with the Eastern Congo Initiative. At the Cinema for Peace Award Gala in Berlin in February 2013 Charlize Theron and her Charlize Theron Africa Outreach Project was awarded the Cinema for Peace Honorary Award for the exemplary dedication to prevent South African Youth from HIV and AIDS. On 12 July 2013 actress Nicole Kidman and UN Women Action Head Lakshmi Puri were honored by Jaka Bizilj at a 'Cinema for Peace' Honorary Dinner for their furthering of women's rights. In 2014, Jaka Bizilj as the Founder of Cinema for Peace invited Pussy Riot to the Olympic Games in Sochi  and introduced them to Hollywood  and to Washington  in order to promote global human rights responsibility and advocate a global sanction list for human rights offenders.

Productions
Entertainment / Shows
 since 1996 - The Black Gospel Singers
 since 1997 - Nabucco, Aida
 since 1998 - Carmen
 since 1999 - Magic of the Dance
 since 2000 - Romanza with Helen Schneider, Königstein Castle Festival, Nahe-Festival (until 2005)
 since 2001 - Stardance, Dancing Queen/Abbafever
 since 2002 - Evita
 since 2003 - The Vienna Johann Strauss Waltz Gala, Festival under the Stars (Herrenchiemsee Castle)
 since 2004 - The Magic Flute, Jedermann
 since 2005 - Last Night of Spectacular Classic, Arena di Bavaria, Wörthersee Festival
 2006 - The World Football Concerts at the FIFA World Cup, Jesus Christ Superstar, Galanacht des Musicals, Mozart Gala
 2007 - The Lord of the Rings in concert, Queen - a ballet homage by Ben van Cauwenberg
 2008 - Aida, the musical by Elton John and Tim Rice
 2009 - Jekyll & Hyde
 2011 - Phantom of the Opera Birthday Gala at the O2 World in Berlin, The Fantastic Shadows
 2012 - The Fantastic Shadows
 2015 – Herr der Ringe and comeback concert of Al Bano and Romina Power at Waldbühne Berlin
 since 2016 - The Wall Museum at East Side Gallery in Berlin 
 2018/2019 - Der Herr der Ringe & Der Hobbit in concert with Pippin Billy Boyd and others  
 2018/2019 - The Music of Hans Zimmer & others 
 2018/2019 - The Music of Der König der Löwen
 2020 - The Magical Music of Harry Potter - live in concert 

Advocacy Events 
 since 2002 - annual Cinema for Peace Gala in Berlin
 2005 - Long Walk to Justice / Live 8 Germany
 2008 - Sports for Peace Campaign at the Summer Olympics in Beijing
 2009 - Cinema for Peace Dinner Honoring Mikhail Gorbachev on the occasion of the 20 anniversary of the fall of the Berlin Wall
 2010 - A Special Evening on Justice at the Review Conference of the Rome Statute in Kampala, Uganda
 2010 – Sports for Peace Gala Event South Africa
 2010 - Art & Cinema for Peace Dinner at the 41 Art Basel
 2010 - Special Youth Day Screening of "Themba - A Boy Called Hope" at Cape Town, presented by Desmond Tutu, starting the anti-AIDS-film-campaign
 2010 - An Evening for Africa in New York with Bob Geldof and Sharon Stone
 2010 - Green Evening in Berlin with Sebastian Copeland and Orlando Bloom
 2011 – Cinema for Peace Honorary Dinner Cannes with Sean Penn, Leonardo DiCaprio, Robert De Niro, Uma Thurman, Jane Fonda
 2011 – Cinema for Peace Dinner and film symposium honoring Hans-Dietrich Genscher in Ljubljana
 2011 – Cinema for Peace Welcome Dinner in St.Tropez
 2011 – Cinema for Peace Dinner for Tibet, screenings, symposium, and speeches on the occasion of the visit of His Holiness the 14 Dalai Lama to Wiesbaden
 2011 - Cinema for Peace Evening on the Issue of Child Soldiers and petition in The Hague at the International Criminal Court
 2011 – Cinema for Peace Dinner in New York celebrating the presentation of the first universal human rights logo
 2011 - Justice Gala in New York staged together with the Office of the Prosecutor of the International Criminal Court	
 2012 - Cinema for Peace Los Angeles – Help Haiti Home  
 2012 – Art & Cinema for Peace Art Basel in support of Ai Weiwei 
 2012 – In the Name of Justice - Farewell Event for Luis Moreno-Ocampo at the International Criminal Court 
 2012 – “Sports for Peace” London honoring Muhammad Ali and celebrating his core values on the occasion of the Olympic Games 
 2012 – Cinema for Peace Dinner New York – Artists help Development and Climate Protection, honoring Sting and Trudie Styler 
 2013 – Cinema for Peace Gala for Humanity, Los Angeles
 2013 - Cinema for Peace Dinner Honoring UN Women, Berlin
 2013 – humanitarian travel to Aleppo, Syria for BILD 
 2014 – Cinema for Peace Heroes Dinner on the occasion of 25 years Fall of the Wall with Mikhail Gorbachev and Miklos Nemeth 
 2014 – Cinema for Peace Symposium in Berlin to avoid a new Cold War (with the New Policy Forum)
 2014 – Visit of the Olympic Games in Sochi with members of Pussy Riot 
 2015 - Cinema for Peace Real Life Heroes Award for Amelia Boynton Robinson 
 2016 – Life vest installation with Ai Weiwei at Konzerthaus Berlin on the occasion of Cinema for Peace Berlin 
 2019 – Act of Gratitude for Mikhail Gorbachev of German civil society and Federal Presidents on the occasion of 30 years Fall of the Wall 
 2020 – Censored Ai Weiwei Film Festival in Berlin

Film Productions
 Not the same procedure as every year - Dinner for All with Bob Geldof and Katja Riemann (2007)
  with Iris Berben, Julia Jentsch, Jan Josef Liefers and Catherine Deneuve (2007)
 I don't feel like dancing short film (2008)
 Eric Bergkraut's documentary Letter to Anna about the murdered Russian journalist Anna Politkovskaya (2008) 
 This Prison Where I Live, co-production for Rex Bloomstein's documentary about the Burmese comedian “Zarganar”(2010)
 Steuer gegen Armut - Eine gute Idee, producer of the German spot of the Robin-Hood-Tax-Campaign, following an idea of Richard Curtis (2010)
 After the Silence, co-production for Marcus Vetter's documentary (2011) 
 The Song of Names, co-production for Vadim Perelman's feature film, starring Anthony Hopkins and Dustin Hoffman (2012)

Awards
 Václav Havel, the former Czech president, in 2008 committed the audience award for "Letter to Anna" at the One World International Human Rights Film Festival. The Prague festival uses international documentary films to highlight opportunities for individuals to champion human rights.
 "I don't feel like dancing" received the award "Best Short Fiction Film" by the "GoEast Festival" in April 2008
 Global Green Award 2018

External links
 www.cinemaforpeace.com
 www.cinemaforpeace-foundation.com
 www.star-entertainment.org
 www.sportsforpeace.de
 https://thewallmuseum.com/

References

1971 births
Living people
Slovenian film producers
Film people from Ljubljana
Journalists from Ljubljana